This is a list of current commissioned Royal New Zealand Navy ships. As of 2022, the Navy operates nine commissioned ships. The affiliations are ceremonial only, with the navy operationally stationed at the Devonport Naval Base, Auckland.

See also 
List of ships of the Royal New Zealand Navy

References

Royal New Zealand Navy Official web site

Royal New Zealand Navy
New Zealand
 
Ships of the Royal New Zealand Navy